Gray v. Sanders, 372 U.S. 368 (1963),  was a  Supreme Court of the United States  case dealing with equal representation in regard to the American election system and formulated the famous "one person, one vote" standard applied in this case for "counting votes in a Democratic primary election for the nomination of a United States Senator and statewide officers — which was practically equivalent to election."

Background
James O'Hear Sanders, a businessman and voter in Fulton County, Georgia, brought a lawsuit which challenged the legality of the County Unit System. James H. Gray, the chairman of the State Executive Committee of the Democratic Party, was one of the named defendants as the suit focused on the Democratic party primary elections which usually determined the selection of Georgia officeholders.

Sanders argued that the County Unit System gave unequal and preferential voting power to smaller counties.  Rural counties which accounted for one-third of Georgia's population,  accounted for a majority of County Unit votes.  Fulton County had 14.11% of Georgia's population at that time,  but only 1.46%  (6 unit votes)  of the 410 Unit Votes.  Echols County, Georgia,  the smallest county in Georgia at the time,  had 1,876 people or .05% of the state's population and .48% (1 unit vote) of the unit system.  The system gave votes to Fulton County at a proportion of one-tenth the county population while giving Echols County a vote which was 10 times the population of the county.  The Supreme Court  granted certiorari in this case despite having refused to hear previous challenges to the Unit System.

The court's decision
By a vote of 8 to 1, the court struck down the County Unit System. Justice William O. Douglas wrote the majority opinion and said "The concept of political equality...can mean only one thing—one person, one vote". The court found that the separation of voters in the same election into different classes was a violation of the 14th Amendment's guarantee of equal protection. Justice John Marshall Harlan II dissented, suggesting the case be sent back for retrial, which would have investigated the constitutional requirements for legislative districts.

Aftermath
Georgia had the option of modifying the County Unit System to make it more equal, but instead the state decided to move to using the popular vote in primary elections.

See also
 List of United States Supreme Court cases, volume 372
 One Person, One Vote

Further reading
Toplak, Jurij. Gray v. Sanders : 372 U.S. 368 (1963). In: Schultz, David W (Ed.). Encyclopedia of the Supreme Court. New York: Facts on file, 2005, pp. 188–189.

References

External links
 

United States Supreme Court cases
United States Supreme Court cases of the Warren Court
United States electoral redistricting case law
United States One Person, One Vote Legal Doctrine
United States equal protection case law
1963 in United States case law
Democratic Party (United States) litigation
Civil rights movement case law